Laurel's Kitchen is a vegetarian cookbook by Laurel Robertson, Carol Flinders, and Bronwen Godfrey. It contributed to the rise of the vegetarian movement of the 1970s.

Background and influence
Laurel's Kitchen had a strong impact on the natural foods movement within the American counterculture. A second edition, The New Laurel's Kitchen, was published in 1986. It had the same subtitle and the same first two authors, and Brian Ruppenthal was the new third author. 
The book has sold over a million copies.

In 1978, Yoga Journal contained two reviews of Laurel's Kitchen, by different authors. In 1994, the Vegetarian Times, a leading magazine for vegetarians, surveyed the most admired cookbooks among a "panel of cookbook authors, food editors, and chefs." The New Laurel's Kitchen was the "clear winner" for "best cookbook for beginners" (p. 107).

Scholarship
A book by Megan Elias (2008), published by the University of Pennsylvania Press, devoted 9 pages to analyzing the book and its place in American culture, contending that "Laurel's Kitchen was as much a lifestyle guide as it was a cookbook" (p. 153).

A scholarly review stated that Elias "gives the renowned countercultural cookbook Laurel’s Kitchen its proper due in American history.... she sees Laurel Robertson and her comrades Carol Flinders and Bronwyn Godfrey struggling, in an intelligent and heartfelt way, against the manipulations of the market, which devalued nutritious food, meaningful domestic labor, and communal connections" (p. 417).

A scholarly book by Mary Drake McFeely (2001) also spent several pages discussing Laurel's Kitchen, which it described as "the Fannie Farmer of vegetarian cooking" (p. 142).

Bibliography

Editions 
 Laurel Robertson, Carol Flinders, and Bronwen Godfrey (1976). Laurel's kitchen: a handbook for vegetarian cookery & nutrition. Berkeley, CA: Nilgiri Press. 
 Laurel Robertson, Carol Flinderss, and Bronwen Godfrey (1978).  Laurel's kitchen: a handbook for vegetarian cookery & nutrition. New York: Bantam Books. 
 Laurel Robertson, Carol Flinders, and Bronwen Godfrey (1979). Laurel's kitchen: a handbook for vegetarian cookery & nutrition. London: Routledge & Kegan Paul Ltd. 
 Laurel Robertson, Carol Flinders, and Brian Ruppenthal (1986). The new Laurel's kitchen: a handbook for vegetarian cookery & nutrition. Berkeley, CA: Ten Speed Press.

Additional Laurel's Kitchen books 
Several related books have been published by the same groups of authors. These books were based on a similar underlying philosophy, and also included the phrase "Laurel's Kitchen" in the title:
 Laurel Robertson, Carol Flinders, Bronwen Godfrey (1984). The Laurel's kitchen bread book: a guide to whole-grain breadmaking. Random House. 
 Laurel Robertson, Carol Flinders, Brian Ruppenthal (1993, revised edition). Laurel's kitchen recipes. Berkeley, CA: Ten Speed Press. 
 Laurel Robertson, Carol Flinders, Brian Ruppenthal (1997). Laurel's kitchen caring: recipes for everyday home caregiving. Berkeley, CA: Ten Speed Press.

References

External links

Vegetarian cookbooks
1976 non-fiction books
1986 non-fiction books
American cookbooks